Charles Henry Lumley VC (1824 – 17 October 1858) was a Scottish recipient of the Victoria Cross, the highest and most prestigious award for gallantry in the face of the enemy that can be awarded to British and Commonwealth forces.

Details
Lumley was about 31 years old, and a captain in the 97th Regiment of Foot  (later The Queen's Own Royal West Kent Regiment) of the British Army during the Crimean War when the following deed took place for which he was awarded the VC.

On 8 September 1855 at Sebastopol, in the Crimea at the assault on the Redan, Captain Lumley was among the first inside the work, where he was immediately attacked by three Russian gunners who were reloading a field piece. He shot two of them with his revolver when he was knocked down by a stone which stunned him for a moment, but on recovery, he drew his sword and was in the act of cheering his men on, when he was severely wounded in the mouth.

Further information
He was born in Forres, Morayshire, Scotland. He later achieved the rank of major and is buried in the churchyard at Brecon Cathedral.

The medal
His Victoria Cross is displayed at The Queen's Own Royal West Kent Regiment Museum in Maidstone, Kent, England.

References

Bibliography
Monuments to Courage (David Harvey, 1999)
The Register of the Victoria Cross (This England, 1997)
Scotland's Forgotten Valour (Graham Ross, 1995)

External links
Location of grave and VC medal (Powys, Wales)

1824 births
1858 deaths
People from Moray
Recipients of the Order of the Medjidie
British Army personnel of the Crimean War
Crimean War recipients of the Victoria Cross
British recipients of the Victoria Cross
Queen's Own Royal West Kent Regiment officers
Chevaliers of the Légion d'honneur
British Army recipients of the Victoria Cross
Burials in Wales